Ebbw Vale bus station, also known as Inner Bypass, is a bus terminus located in the town centre of Ebbw Vale, South Wales.

Background 
Ebbw Vale is a town at the head of the Ebbw Valley,  from the south of the Brecon Beacons National Park. As such the town is the northern terminus of services through the valley towards Cardiff, Caerphilly, and Cwmbran, as well as having services to Tredegar and Abergavenny.

In 2019 residents in the nearby area complained at cuts to bus services by operator Stagecoach South Wales which had left them "like prisoners in their own village". The town of Cwm has been reduced to one bus each hour on weekdays, and no services on Sunday. The town's evening services are already subsidised by Blaenau Gwent County Borough Council who state they are unable to further subsidise services to towns on the route.

Layout 
The sits on an island in the centre of the A4046 through the town, and faces the line of retail businesses along the road. As such it is referred to on maps as "Inner Bypass" station.

The station has six bus stands, identified as numbers 1-5.

Destinations 
Ebbw Vale is the terminus for a number of Stagecoach services, and serves as an interchange for travellers headed to Tredegar and Abergavenny.

Railway station 
Ebbw Vale Town railway station provides rail transport to destinations on the Ebbw Valley railway line, which include Cardiff Central, Newport (from 2021), and infrequent services to Bridgend.

The station is an eight-minute walk from the bus station. The town has a large number of car parking facilities near to the station.

See also 
 List of bus stations in Wales
 Transport in Wales

References 

Bus stations in Wales
Buildings and structures in Blaenau Gwent